A. indica may refer to:

 Acalypha indica, a plant species found throughout tropical Africa and South Africa, in India and Sri Lanka, as well as in Yemen
 Acemya indica, a tachinid fly species
 Acromantis indica, the Burmese mantis, a praying mantis species found in Myanmar
 Amantis indica, a praying mantis species native to India
Anteaeolidiella indica, a species of sea slug
 Aristolochia indica, a creeper plant species found in Kerala in India and also in Sri Lanka
 Atuna indica, a plant species endemic to India
 Awasthiella indica, a fungus species
 Azadirachta indica, the neem, a tree species

See also
 Indica (disambiguation)